The Court of Session is the supreme civil court of Scotland and constitutes part of the College of Justice; the supreme criminal court of Scotland is the High Court of Justiciary. The Court of Session sits in Parliament House in Edinburgh and is both a trial court and a court of appeal. Decisions of the court can be appealed to the Supreme Court of the United Kingdom, with the permission of either the Inner House or the Supreme Court. However, the majority of complex, important, or high value cases are brought in the Court of Session. Cases can be remitted to the Court of Session from the sheriff courts, including the Sheriff Personal Injury Court, at the request of the presiding sheriff. Legal aid, administered by the Scottish Legal Aid Board, is available to persons with little disposable income for cases in the Court of Session.

The court is a unitary collegiate court, with all judges other than the Lord President of the Court of Session and the Lord Justice Clerk holding the same rank and title—Senator of the College of Justice and also Lord or Lady of Council and Session. The Lord President is chief justice of the court, and also head of the judiciary of Scotland; the Lord Justice Clerk is his deputy. There are 35 senators, in addition to a number of temporary judges; these temporary judges are typically serving sheriffs and sheriffs principal, or advocates in private practice. The senators sit also in the High Court of Justiciary, where the Lord President is called the Lord Justice General, and senators are known as Lords Commissioners of Justiciary.

The court is divided into the Inner House of twelve senators, which is primarily an appeal court, and the Outer House, which is primarily a court of first instance. The Inner House is further divided into two divisions of six senators: the first division is presided over by the Lord President, and the second division is presided over by the Lord Justice Clerk. Cases in the Inner House are normally heard before a bench of three senators, though more complex or important cases are presided over by five senators. On very rare occasions the whole Inner House has presided over a case. Cases in the Outer House are heard by a single senator sitting as a Lord Ordinary, occasionally with a jury of twelve.

The court is administered by the Scottish Courts and Tribunals Service, and the most senior clerk of court is the Principal Clerk of Session and Justiciary; the Principal Clerk is responsible for all court staff, and is also responsible for the administration of the High Court of Justiciary.

The court was established in 1532 by an Act of the Parliament of Scotland, and was initially presided over by the Lord Chancellor of Scotland and had equal numbers of clergy and laity. The judges were all appointed from the King's Council.

As of May 2017, the Lord President was Lord Carloway, who was appointed on 19 December 2015, and the Lord Justice Clerk was Lady Dorrian, who was appointed on 13 April 2016.

History

Establishment
The Lords of Council and Session had previously been part of the King's Council, but after receiving support in the form of a papal bull of 1531, King James V established a separate institution—the College of Justice or Court of Session—in 1532, with a structure based on that of the Parlement of Paris. The Lord Chancellor of Scotland was to preside over the court, which was to be composed of fifteen lords appointed from the King's Council. Seven of the lords had to be churchmen, while another seven had to be laymen.  An Act of Parliament in 1640 restricted membership of the court to laymen only, by withdrawing the right of churchmen to sit in judgement. The number of laymen was increased to maintain the number of lords in the court.

Courts Act 1672
The Courts Act 1672 allowed for five of the Lords of Session to be appointed as Lords Commissioners of Justiciary, and as such becomes judges of the High Court of Justiciary. The High Court of Justiciary is the supreme criminal court of Scotland. Previously the Lord Justice General, the president of the High Court, had appointed deputes to preside in his absence. From 1672 to 1887, the High Court consisted of the Lord Justice General, Lord Justice Clerk, and five Lords of Session.

Treaty of Union
The Court of Session is explicitly preserved "in all time coming" in Article XIX of the Treaty of Union between England and Scotland, subsequently passed into legislation by the Acts of Union in 1706 and 1707 respectively.

19th Century

Court of Session Act 1810 
Several significant changes were made to the court during the 19th century, with the Court of Session Act 1810 formally dividing the Court of Session into the Outer House (with first-instance jurisdiction before a Lord Ordinary) and Inner House (with appellate jurisdiction.) Cases in the Outer House were to be heard by Lords Ordinary who either sat alone or with a jury of twelve. Cases in the Inner House were to be heard by three Lords of Council and Session, but significant or complicated cases were to be heard by five or more judges.  A further separation was made in 1815, by the Jury Trials (Scotland) Act 1815, with the creation of a lesser Jury Court to allow certain civil cases to be tried by jury. In 1830 the Jury Court, along with the Admiralty and Commissary courts, was absorbed into the Court of Session following the enactment of the Court of Session Act 1830.

Judicial remuneration 
In 1834 the remuneration and working conditions were a matter of public discussion and debate in the House of Commons. On 6 May 1834 Sir George Sinclair addressed the House of Commons to plead for an increase in the salaries of the senators, noting that "a Civil Judge in the Supreme Court in Scotland received only " and the masters in the Court of Chancery were paid . A Select Committee was appointed to investigate the matter.

In October 1834, The Spectator reported on the conflicting views around the remuneration and working conditions of the judges of the Court of Session, with conflicting views being presented in response to the Report on the Scotch Judges' Salaries. The Spectator reported the arguments made by Sir William Rae, Lord Advocate, that the judges of the Court of Session had considerable duties, which he listed as:

The Select Committee's Report recommended that the salaries of the Lord President, Lord Justice Clerk and remaining senators should be increased, and also recommended that all senators should become Lords Commissioners of Justiciary. The recommended salaries were:
However, The Spectator was very critical of the actual amount of work done by the judges of the Court, noting that there was much public criticism of their effectiveness. The article noted that the judges were entitled to 7 months vacation in each year. The Spectator also asserted that civil justice was out of the reach of the poor in Scotland.

Unification of supreme courts judiciary 
In 1887 all of the Lords of Session were made Lords Commissioners of Justiciary, and thus judges of the High Court of Justiciary, following the passage of the Criminal Procedure (Scotland) Act 1887.

Remit and jurisdiction

Civil cases
Where a choice of jurisdiction exists between the Court of Session and the sheriff courts, including the Sheriff Personal Injury Court, it is for the pursuer to decide which court to raise the action in. The court sits in Parliament House in Edinburgh and is both a trial court and a court of appeal.

Exchequer cases
The primary task of the Court of Session is to decide on civil law cases. The court is also the Court of Exchequer for Scotland, a jurisdiction previously held by the Court of Exchequer. (In 1856, the functions of that court were transferred to the Court of Session, and one of the Lords Ordinary sits as Lord Ordinary in Exchequer Causes when hearing cases therein.) This was restated by the Court of Session Act 1988.

Admiralty cases
The Court of Session is also the admiralty court for Scotland, having been given the duties of that court by the provisions of the Court of Session Act 1830. The boundaries of the jurisdiction of the Court of Session in maritime cases were specified in 1999 by an Order in Council: the Scottish Adjacent Waters Boundaries Order 1999.

Nobile officium 
The jurisdiction of the Court of Session extends beyond statutory and common law powers, with the Court having an equitable and inherent jurisdiction called the nobile officium, unique among British courts. The nobile officium enables the court to provide a legal remedy where statute or the common law are silent, and prevent mistakes in procedure or practice that would lead to injustice. The exercise of this power is limited by adherence to precedent, and when legislation or the common law do not already specify the relevant remedy. Thus, the court cannot set aside a statutory power, but can deal with situations where the law is silent, or where there is an omission in statute. Such an omission is sometimes termed a casus improvisus.

The nobile officium was used to implement recognition of an order of the High Court of Justice of England and Wales for the placement of children in secure accommodation in Scotland, in the case of Cumbria County Council, Petitioners [2016] CSIH 92. An application was made to the Court of Session under the nobile officium by Cumbria County Council, Stockport Metropolitan Council, and Blackpool Borough Council on behalf of four children. There was insufficient accommodation in England to house the children, so the councils sought to place them in suitable Scottish accommodation. However, legislation was silent on the cross-border jurisdiction of such orders as made by the High Court of Justice. Nonetheless, equivalent orders made by a Scottish court were enforceable in England and Wales. Thus, the Court of Session found, using its inherent powers, that the orders could be applied as though they had been issued by the Court of Session itself.

In September 2019 UK Prime Minister Boris Johnson said that he would "rather be dead in a ditch" than apply for an extension to Britain's application to leave the European Union (Brexit), due on 31 October, although the UK parliament had required him to do so under circumstances laid out in the Benn Act. Following this, an application was made to the Court of Session to require the Prime Minister to sign a letter requesting extension if no exit deal could be agreed in time. The applicants hoped that the unique power of nobile officium would enable the court to send the article 50 extension letter on Johnson's behalf, if he declined to do so.

Appellate jurisdiction
Appeals in the Court of Session are generally heard by the Inner House before three judges, although in important cases in which there is a conflict of authority a court of five judges or, exceptionally, seven, may be convened. The Inner House is sub-divided into two divisions of equal authority and jurisdiction - the First Division, headed by the Lord President; and the Second Division headed by the Lord Justice Clerk. The courts to hear each case are, ordinarily, drawn from these divisions. When neither is available to chair a hearing, an Extra Division of three senators is summoned, chaired by the most senior judge present; due to pressure of business the Extra Division sits frequently nowadays.

Until 2015 civil cases that went to a full proof (hearing) in the sheriff courts of Scotland could be appealed by right to the Inner House of the Court of Session. Appellants could take the appeal to a sheriff principal for an initial appeal, and then onto the Inner House, or they could take the appeal directly to the Inner House. However, the appellate jurisdiction of sheriffs principal for all civil cases (including summary cause and small claims actions) was transferred to the Sheriff Appeal Court following passage of the Courts Reform (Scotland) Act 2014. The 2014 Act also modified the appellate jurisdiction of the Inner House with civil appeals from the sheriff courts being heard by an appeal sheriff sitting in the Sheriff Appeal Court. Such appeals are binding on all sheriff courts in Scotland, and appeals can only be remitted (transferred) to the Inner House where they are deemed to be of wider public interest, raise a significant point of law, or are particularly complex:

Legal aid
Legal aid, administered by the Scottish Legal Aid Board, is available to persons with little disposable income for cases in the Court of Session.

Oath of Allegiance
The Oath of Allegiance is taken by holders of political office in Scotland before the Lord President of the Court of Session at a meeting of the court.

Acts of Sederunt 

Civil procedure in Scotland is regulated by the Court of Session through Acts of Sederunt, which are subordinate legislation and take legal force as Scottish statutory instruments. The power to enact Acts of Sederunt is granted by the Courts Reform (Scotland) Act 2014 and the Tribunals (Scotland) Act 2014, which replaced powers regulated by the Court of Session Act 1988 and the Sheriff Courts (Scotland) Act 1971. These are generally incorporated into the Rules of Court, which are published by the Scottish Courts and Tribunals Service and form the basis for Scots civil procedure.

Acts of Sederunt regulate civil procedure in the Court of Session, the sheriff courts of Scotland (including the Sheriff Appeal Court and Sheriff Personal Injury Court), and in the tribunals of Scotland. The Court of Session can amend or repeal any enactment, including primary legislation, if it relates to matters an Act of Sederunt may cover. Rules for regulating civil procedure are decided upon by the Scottish Civil Justice Council before being presented to the Lords of Session for decision; the Lords of Session may approve, amend or reject the rules so presented.

An Act of Sederunt, Act of Sederunt (Regulation of Advocates) 2011, devolves authority to the Faculty of Advocates to regulate admission to practice as an advocate before the Court of Session and the High Court of Justiciary; advocates are notionally officers of the court, and are de jure appointed by the court.

Structure

Houses and Lords Ordinary
The Court of Session constitutes part of the College of Justice, and is divided into two houses. The Lords Ordinary sit in the Outer House, and usually singly. The Lords of Council and Session sit in the Inner House, typically in threes. The nature of cases referred to the Court of Session will determine which house that case shall be heard in.

Inner House

The Inner House is the senior part of the Court of Session, and is both a court of appeal and a court of first instance. The Inner House has historically been the main locus of an extraordinary equitable power called the nobile officium – the High Court of Justiciary has a similar power in criminal cases. Criminal appeals in Scotland are handled by the High Court of Justiciary sitting as the Court of Appeal.

The Inner House is the part of the Court of Session which acts as a court of appeal for cases decided the Outer House and of civil cases from the sheriff courts, the Court of the Lord Lyon, Scottish Land Court, and the Lands Tribunal for Scotland. The Inner House always sits as a panel of at least three senators and with no jury.

Unlike in the High Court of Justiciary, there is a right of appeal to the Supreme Court of the United Kingdom of cases from the Inner House. The right of appeal only exists when the Court of Session grants leave to this effect or when the decision of the Inner House is by majority. Until the Constitutional Reform Act 2005 came into force in October 2009, this right of appeal was to the House of Lords (or sometimes to the Judicial Committee of the Privy Council).

Outer House
The Outer House is a court of first instance, although some statutory appeals are remitted to it by the Inner House. Such appeals are originally referred from the sheriff courts, the court of first instance for civil causes in the court system of Scotland. Judges in the Outer House are referred to as Lord or Lady [name], or as Lord Ordinary. The Outer House is superficially similar to the High Court in England and Wales, and in this house judges sit singly—and with a jury of twelve in personal injury or defamation actions. Subject-matter jurisdiction is extensive and extends to all kinds of civil claims unless expressly excluded by statute, and it shares much of this jurisdiction with the sheriff courts. Some classes of cases, such as intellectual property disputes, are heard by an individual judge designated by the Lord President as the jurist for intellectual property cases.

Final judgments of the Outer House, as well as some important judgements on procedure, may be appealed to the Inner House. Other judgments may be so appealed with leave.

Lands Valuation Appeal Court 
The Lands Valuation Appeal Court is a Scottish civil court, composed of three Court of Session judges, and established under Section 7 of the Valuation of Lands (Scotland) Amendment Act 1879. It hears cases where the decision of a local Valuation Appeal Committee is disputed. The senators who make up the Lands Valuation Appeal Court was specified in 2013 by the Act of Sederunt (Lands Valuation Appeal Court) 2013, which has both Lord Carloway (Lord President) and Lady Dorrian (Lord Justice Clerk) as members with a further four senators specified.

Rights of audience
Members of the Faculty of Advocates, known as advocates or counsel, and as of 1990 also some solicitors, known as solicitor-advocates, have practically exclusive right of audience rights of audience in the court. Barristers from England and Wales have no right of audience, which caused controversy in 2011 (over an appeal from an immigration tribunal) and again in 2015 (over an appeal from a tax tribunal) when barristers recognised by the General Council of the Bar were denied the right to take an appeal on behalf of clients they had represented at tribunal.

Judges and office holders

The court's president is the Lord President, the second most senior judge is the Lord Justice Clerk, with a further 33 senators of the College of Justice holding office as Lords of Council and Session. The total numbers of judges is fixed by Section 1 of the Court of Session Act 1988, and subject to amendment by Order in Council. Judges are appointed for life, subject to dismissal if they are found unfit for office, and subject to a compulsory retirement age of 75.

Temporary judges can also be appointed.

The court is a unitary collegiate court, with all judges other than the Lord President and the Lord Justice Clerk holding the same rank and title—Senator of the College of Justice and also Lord or Lady of Council and Session. There are thirty-four judges, in addition to a number of temporary judges; these temporary judges are typically sheriffs, or advocates in private practice. The judges sit also in the High Court of Justiciary, where the Lord President is called the Lord Justice General.

Appointment
To be eligible for appointment as a senator, or temporary judge, a person must have served at least five years as sheriff or sheriff principal, been an advocate for five years, a solicitor with five years rights of audience before the Court of Session or High Court of Justiciary, or been a Writer to the Signet for ten years (having passed the exam in civil law at least two years before application.)
Appointments are made by the First Minister of Scotland on the recommendation of the Judicial Appointments Board for Scotland. The Judicial Appointments Board has a statutory authority for making recommendations under Sections 9 to 27 of the Judiciary and Courts (Scotland) Act 2008 (as amended by the Courts Reform (Scotland) Act 2014). Appointments to the Inner House are made by the Lord President and Lord Justice Clerk, with the consent of the Scottish Ministers.

Removal from office
The Lord President, Lord Justice Clerk and other senators can be removed from office after a tribunal has been convened to examine their fitness for office. The tribunal is convened on the request of the Lord President, or in other circumstances that the First Minister sees fit. However, the First Minister must consult the Lord President (for all other judges) and the Lord Justice Clerk (when the Lord President is under investigation.) Should the tribunal recommend their dismissal the Scottish Parliament can resolve that the First Minister make a recommendation to the Monarch.

Lord President

The Lord President is the most senior judge of the Court of Session, and is also president of the 1st Division of the Inner House.

Lord Justice Clerk

The Justice Clerk is the second most senior judge of the Court of Session, and deputises for the Lord President when the Lord President is absent, unable to fulfil his duties, or when there is a vacancy for Lord President. The Lord Justice Clerk is president of the 2nd Division of the Inner House.

Principal Clerk of Session and Justiciary
The administration of the court is part of the Scottish Courts and Tribunals Service, and is led by the Principal Clerk of Session and Justiciary. The Principal Clerk is responsible for the administration of the Supreme Courts of Scotland and their associated staff. As of June 2018, the Principal Clerk is Gillian Prentice.

See also
 Bill Chamber
 Office of the Accountant of Court
 Senators of the College of Justice
 Historic list of senators of the College of Justice
 List of Scottish legal cases

Notes

References

Further reading

External links
 Court Service
 Court of Session Digital Archive 
 Faculty of Advocates
 Scottish Legal Aid Board

 
1532 establishments in Scotland
16th century in Scotland
Appellate courts
Civil law (common law)
Royal Mile
College of Justice
1532 in law
Privy Council of Scotland
Courts and tribunals established in 1532